These are the winners and nominees for the Tony Award for Best Costume Design.  The award was first presented in 1947 and included both plays and musicals. In 1961, and since 2005 the category was divided into Costume Design in a Play and Costume Design in a Musical with each genre receiving its own award.

Winners and nominees

1940s

1950s

1960s

1970s

1980s

1990s

2000s

See also
 Tony Award for Best Costume Design in a Musical
 Tony Award for Best Costume Design in a Play
 Drama Desk Award for Outstanding Costume Design
 Laurence Olivier Award for Best Costume Design

External links
 Tony Awards Official site
 Tony Awards at Internet Broadway database Listing
 Tony Awards at broadwayworld.com

Tony Awards
Awards established in 1947
1947 establishments in the United States